Creating a Role is theatre actor/director Constantin Stanislavski's third and final book on his method for learning the art of acting. It was first published in Russian in 1957; Theatre Art Books published an English-language edition, translated by Elizabeth Reynolds Hapgood, in 1961.

In the two preceding installments, An Actor Prepares (1936) and Building a Character (1948), Stanislavski describes ways in which an actor imagines the lived experience of their character, and then expresses that inner life and persona through speech and movement. Creating a Role applies these principles to rehearsal, in which the actor improves their understanding of the role, and how it fits the script.

Contents
Part I: Griboyedov's Woe from Wit

Part II: Shakespeare's Othello

Part III: Gogol's The Inspector General

Appendices

See also
 Stanislavski's system
 Method acting

References

External links
 

1948 non-fiction books
Non-fiction books about acting
Russian non-fiction books
Works about performing arts education